The Book of the Dead (Reu Nu Pert Em Hru) is a 1998 album by Ars Nova. It had slightly different releases in the Japanese  and European markets. It was generally well received.

Track listing
 "Prologue: Re" (1:35)
 "Ankh" (5:11)
 "Interlude 1:"
Japanese: "Horus" (1:31)
European: "Nut" (1:11)
 "The 42 Gods" (5:15)
 "Interlude 2: Anubis" (0:40)
 "Held of Iaru" (10:43)
 "Interlude 3:"
Japanese : "Thoth" (1:27)
European : "Sekhem" (1:03)
 "The Judgement of Osiris" (7:41)
 "Interlude 4:"
Japanese : "Shu" (0:45)
European : "Nephthys" (0:33)
 "Ani's Heart and Maat's Feather" (9:20)
 "Epilogue: Hapi" (1:01)

Band
 Keiko Kumagai - keyboards
 Akiko Takahasho - drums

Additional players
 Ken Ishita - bass

References

1998 albums
Concept albums